Tuttle is an English surname. Notable people with the surname include:

A. Theodore Tuttle (1919–1986), Mormon leader
Ashley Tuttle (born 1971), musical actress and dancer
Bill Tuttle (1929–1998), baseball player and public speaker
Charles E. Tuttle (1915–1993), publisher
Daniel Joe Tuttle (1957), American driver
Daniel Sylvester Tuttle (1837-1923), bishop of the Episcopal Church
Dave Tuttle (born 1972), UK football manager
Elaina Marie Tuttle (1963-2016), ornithologist and behavioral geneticist
Elbert Tuttle (1897–1996), US judge
Elmo Tuttle, fictional comic strip character
Emma Rood Tuttle (1839–1916), American writer and poet
Frank Tuttle (1892–1963), film director and writer
Fred Tuttle (1919–2003), farmer, actor, and candidate for the US Senate
Gerry Tuttle (1926-2006), American football player
Gina Tuttle (born 1973), actress and voice artist
Herbert Tuttle (1846–1894), American historian
Hiram A. Tuttle (1837–1911), Governor of New Hampshire
Horace Parnell Tuttle (1837–1923), astronomer whose name is borne by an asteroid and several comets
Hudson Tuttle (1836–1910), American Spiritualist from Ohio
James Madison Tuttle (1823-1892), Union general in the Civil War and Democratic candidate in 1863 for Governor of Iowa
John Tuttle (1616–1683), Established the Tuttle Farm in Dover, New Hampshire
John Tuttle (politician) (1951–2022), American politician
Julia Tuttle (1849–1898), businesswoman, farmer, and "Mother of Miami"
Karen Tuttle (1920–2010), viola teacher
Lisa Tuttle (born 1952), author
Lurene Tuttle (1906–1986), character actress
Lyle Tuttle (1931–2019), tattoo artist
Matt Tuttle (musician), drummer
Matt Tuttle (soccer) (born 1987), American soccer player
Merlin Tuttle (born 1941), ecologist
Molly Tuttle (born 1993), American bluegrass musician
O. Frank Tuttle (1916–1983), American mineralogist and geochemist
Oral P. Tuttle (1889–1957), American lawyer and politician
Perry Tuttle (born 1959), NFL football player
Richard Tuttle (born 1941), postminimalist artist
Rick Tuttle (born 1940), Los Angeles politician
Robert H. Tuttle (born 1943), US ambassador
Russell Tuttle (born 1939), primate morphologist and paleoanthropologist
Seth Tuttle (born 1992), American basketball player
Shy Tuttle (born 1995), American football player
Steve Tuttle (born 1966), hockey player
William J. Tuttle (1912–2007), American make-up artist
William M. Tuttle Jr. (born 1937), Author and historian
William P. Tuttle (1847–1924), financier and entrepreneur
William E. Tuttle Jr. (1870–1923), U.S. Representative from New Jersey
William G. T. Tuttle Jr. (1935–2020), retired U.S. Army general 
William Jeremiah Tuttle (1882–1930) aka Bill Tuttle American Olympic freestyle swimmer and water polo player

Fictional characters 

Archibald "Harry" Tuttle, a character played by Robert De Niro in the 1985 film Brazil
Captain Tuttle, the fictitious central character in a 1973 episode of the TV series M*A*S*H
Gregory Tuttle, an alias name used by Alexei Volkoff, a character in the TV series Chuck

References 

English-language surnames